The Alfa Romeo 156 (Type 932) is a compact executive car produced by the Italian automobile manufacturer Alfa Romeo. It was introduced at the 1997 Frankfurt Motor Show as the replacement for the Alfa Romeo 155. The 156 received a positive reception and in the following year went on to win the 1998 European Car of the Year award. The 156 saloon was discontinued in Europe late in 2005, while the Q4 Crosswagon continued in production until the end of 2007.

Cars were assembled at the Fiat Group factory in Pomigliano d'Arco, Italy and at a General Motors facility in Rayong, Thailand. Production in Thailand began in March 2002 and ran for only a couple of years. The cars produced there were targeted for the Asia-Pacific markets. Between 1996 and 2007, 673,435 units of the 156 were produced.

The 156 was available in saloon, Sportwagon (estate) and Crosswagon (crossover) bodystyles with seven engine configurations; it went through two facelifts, first in 2002 and then in 2003. The Sportwagon advertising campaign was made featuring actress Catherine Zeta-Jones.

In 2005, the 159 became the replacement for the 156.

Overview 

Since the 156's introduction, various four cylinder engine configurations were available and included the Alfa Romeo Twin Spark engine (1.6 L - , 1.8 L -  and 2.0 L - ) 16 valve models with variable valve timing, along with the straight-4 1.9 litre 8-valve . The range also included a straight-5 2.4 litre 10-valve  JTD common rail turbodiesel engine.

Initially the 156 range was available with different options (packs) like a sport pack that included Blitz clothing, Momo leather interior and Recaro seats, it also included  wheels, lowered suspension and leather-trimmed steering wheel and gear knob. The Lusso pack added with Momo's mahogany steering wheel and gear knob and for Nordic countries, a special winter pack consisting of fog lights, headlight washers, and heated seats was available.

Starting from 1999 a five-speed Selespeed automated manual transmission was available as an option on the 2.0 litre Twin Spark version and a four-speed automatic Q-System on the 2.5 litre V6 version, the Q-system provided the option of using the car as a normal automatic or being able to shift manually with H-pattern, it has three automatic modes: city, sport and ice.

A significant addition to the 156 range came in 2000 with the introduction of the Sportwagon Station wagon or estate bodystyle. The new bodystyle was in development from 1998 by Stola under the project code '932 AF'. According to Stola's records the initial considered name was "Powerwagon". While not a core part of the company's range, estate versions of the Alfasud and 33 - the first to carry the name Sportwagon - were produced and a 75 Sportwagon was shown at Geneva, but became an early victim of the Fiat takeover. The Sportwagon was also available with Boge-Nivomat self-levelling hydropneumatic rear suspension. The Sportwagon was marketed as a lifestyle estate without large carrying capacity. The Sportwagon bodystyle filled a gap in the market that Alfa Romeo had distanced themselves from since the 33 SportWagon of the 1980s.

In 2001 engines were upgraded to comply with the Euro III standards and were rated at  (1.6 L),  (1.8 L),  (2.0 L) and  (2.5 L).

Design
Designed by Alfa Centro Stile under the guidance of head designer Walter de'Silva the 156s shape was intended to be distinctly Alfa Romeo. Its styling included high, curved flanks, retro styled front door handles, recessed rear door handles, and a deep grille requiring an off-centre number plate holder. The design featured visually deemphasized rear door handles and accentuated front handles, giving the illusion of a coupé profile. The design was influenced by the Alfa Romeo 1900, Giulietta and Giulia. The 156 achieved a drag coefficient (Cd) of 0.31.

Interior

The original interior uses a scalloped upper dashboard and a simple centre console. The main controls and displays are angled to the driver. The interior design lacks cup holders.

The 156 Sportwagon features fold-down rear seats to increase the luggage area normally covered by a privacy screen.

2002 saw an update to both the interior and exterior of the 156.

Facelifts

2002 facelift (first series)

2002 also saw the arrival of a facelifted interior with different matte-finish surfacing and chrome highlights.
This new version featured the 147's dual-zone digital climate controller while the interior climate could also be controlled via an air quality sensor. A different choice of colours were available for the interior, with the option of a two-tone interior very much like that on offer from its European rivals. A wider range of options including xenon lighting, tele-informatics (CONNECT and CONNECT NAV) and a Bose stereo system were available, the stereo system could now also be operated via buttons on the steering wheel. Also, the Selespeed gearbox control system was updated, buttons on the steering wheel were replaced by paddle shifters, as seen on the earlier Alfa Romeo 147. In the center console, the designers added a multifunctional display with trip computer, fault, and service monitor.

The upgrade also included electronic stability control VDC (Vehicle Dynamic Control) with an emergency brake assist device and slip control ASR (Anti Slip Regulation) came as standard. Additionally, an MSR (Motor Schleppmoment Regelung) was added to the car, this device prevents wheel skidding by restoring torque to the engine for example when the gear is shifted down abruptly under conditions of low grip. Passive safety was also made better, all versions got window airbags as standard. The 2.0 L JTS   engine with gasoline direct injection replaced the 2.0 litre Twin Spark engine, offering more low end torque and more power than the Twin Spark. The diesel engines were also uprated. The only notable difference exterior-wise was body-coloured mirrors and bumper strips which were earlier black.

2003 facelift (second series)
Late 2003 saw the launch of a facelifted 156, with new front and rear fascias designed by Giorgetto Giugiaro. A new top-of-the-line model was added to the line up called TI (Turismo Internazionale) designating a sporty kit, this version was equipped with modified suspension, bigger wheels (215/45 17") and leather-trimmed interior. The GTA models never received the exterior update. Diesel engines underwent a major overhaul which included a new four-valve per cylinder heads and a second stage common rail injection with 1400 bar maximum injection pressure with up to five injections per cycle for lower noise, consumption, and higher performance.

Variants

156 GTA

The 156 GTA and 156 Sportwagon GTA were launched at the Frankfurt Motor Show in September 2001. The GTA was named after the Alfa Romeo GTA from the 1960s, the letters GTA meaning Gran Turismo Alleggerita. Developed alongside the 147 GTA, it was an exclusive high-performance model hand assembled on a dedicated production line separate to the standard 156 models.

Development of the GTA styling models and engineering design was entrusted in early 2000 to Stola with styling data provided by Centro Stile. Stola completed six prototypes that were further mechanically assembled by Alfa Romeo. Two of those protypes were presented at the Frankfurt Motor Show.

1,973 berlinas and 1,678 Sportwagons were built until the GTA production stopped in October 2005, as the V6 engine as unable to meet emissions regulations and due to the 156 being replaced by the 159. The GTA was sold in limited numbers, with right-hand drive vehicles holding a premium over left-hand drive vehicles due to their rarity.

The very first GTA was sold via online auction, from 13 to 23 September, the duration of the Frankfurt Motor Show. Winning bid was €48,691.26, which was donated to "Telethon" charity fund.

The 3.2-litre Bussone V6 engine (The big Busso, so-called after legendary Alfa Romeo engineer Giuseppe Busso). This engine is praised universally for its sound and revving capabilities.
This was the largest iteration of the engine built by Alfa Romeo. Overall, the car weighed  more than the standard V6 156.

The GTA variants shared a common interior with post-facelift 156 variants. The doors, boot lid and bonnet were also shared. All else was unique to the GTA, with the engine specifically made by Fiat and Maserati Research Centres.

The GTA did not receive the Giugiaro designed facelift introduced on the 156 in 2003, but continued with the acclaimed Walter de Silva design to the very end of production.

The steering was also made faster, only 1.7 turns from lock to lock compared to 2.1 in normal models. The GTA had also larger brakes (Brembo), at front  discs and rear .

156 Sportwagon Q4

In 2004 Sportwagon Q4, an all-wheel drive version of the Sportwagon was launched in some markets. Graziano Trasmissioni, the Turin-based transmission specialist, developed this system. Other than the ride height, special 5-spoke 17-inch wheels and a "Q4" badge on the tail set the Sportwagon Q4 apart from the front-wheel drive 156 versions. The Sportwagon Q4 was only available on LHD markets, with no RHD models being built or sold.

156 Crosswagon Q4

The Crosswagon Q4 was launched in 2004 with a crossover look and enhanced off-road capabilities. The Crosswagon's ride height was raised further compared to the Sportwagon Q4, giving the car better approach and departure angles; at  it was  taller than a standard 156. Tall-sidewall all-season tyres on 17 inch wheels were standard. The Crosswagon was made to look more like an all-terrain vehicle by unique front and rear bumpers and door sills with steel inserts. After the introduction of the 159 in 2005 the Crosswagon remained in production, and in 2007 it was the last 156 model to be discontinued.

Special versions

Alfa Romeo 156 GTAm
The Alfa Romeo 156 GTAm was shown at the Bologna Motor Show in December 2002. The car was built by Fiat Group's partner N.Technology. The car had widened wheel arches, 19 inch tyres and was equipped with N.Technology limited slip differential. This car never reached production phase.

Alfa Romeo 156 Sportwagon GTA 3.5 Autodelta
At the 2004 Geneva Motor Show Italian-based tuning firm Autodelta unveiled a 156 Sportwagon prototype equipped with a  V6 engine that developed  at 6,800 rpm. Weight was reduced using a composite engine bonnet.

Autodelta 156 GTA 3.7 V6

Specifications

Platform and suspension
The 156 uses a platform derived from the Alfa Romeo 155, which in turn was derived from the Fiat Group's "Tipo" platform. However, it is sufficiently different from the original "Tipo" one to be seen as a new platform. The 156 is a highly developed front-wheel drive car; (the Cross/Sportwagon Q4 offered four-wheel drive in left-hand drive markets) with a double high wishbone front suspension and updated version of MacPherson type rear suspension, which consists of a telescopic vertical strut with coaxial spring and two transverse links of different lengths and a longitudinal strut. This structure means that the rear wheels have a tiny passive steering ability. Weight saving materials (mainly aluminium) have been used in several parts both front and rear suspension.

For the 156 GTA, weight saving materials were also used in many other parts like magnesium framed front seats and dashboard frame. The 156 GTA only shared common parts with other 156 variants with respect to the facelift interior, doors, bonnet and boot lid.

Engines
The 156 offered various engines and power output choices during its lifespan, four and six cylinder petrol engines and four and five cylinder
diesel engines, all produced at Pratola Serra except the V6 engines, which were produced at Alfa Romeo's Arese plant, with the GTA engines being produced at the Maserati Research Centre. The 2.4 JTD diesel was world's first common rail diesel engine in a passenger car.

Use in law enforcement
The Alfa 156 sedan and the station wagon were widely used by the Italian and other police and other law enforcement forces. In Italy it was used by Carabinieri, Polizia di Stato, Polizia provinciale, Polizia Penitenziaria and Guardia di Finanza. Subsequently, the 156 was replaced by the more modern Alfa Romeo 159.

Awards

In 1998, an international jury of 56 journalists (40 of whom voted for the 156) representing 21 countries awarded the Alfa 156 the European Car of the Year award; it was described as having a "very refined suspension layout so to offer an impeccable roadholding". The 2.5 V6 engine was awarded with the International Engine of the Year award in 2000. The 156 has won more than 35 awards, including:
Technical Innovation Award – Common Rail 1998 – (Autocar – Great Britain)
Best Compact Executive 1998 – (What Car? – Great Britain)
Best Compact Executive Car 1998 – (Auto Express – Great Britain)
Die Besten Autos 1998, Paul Pietsch Preis – Innovation prize for Common Rail, (Auto, Motor und Sport – Germany)
Auto 1 Europa 1998 – (panel of engineers, drivers, and journalists from the eleven European magazines, headed by Auto Bild)
Auto Trophy 1998 – (Auto Zeitung – Germany)
Trophee Du Design 1998 – (Automobile Magazine – France)
European Award for Automotive Design – (Belgium, 1998)
Car of the Year 1998 in Denmark, Spain, Netherlands, Luxembourg, Germany, Portugal, France, and Croatia
Car of the Year in South Africa 1999 – (South African Guild of Motoring Journalists)
Prix de l’Innovation Technique pour le Common Rail 1997 (France)
L’automobile più bella del mondo ("The most beautiful car in the world") 1997 (Italy)

Motorsport
The 156 competed in various motor racing championships including the World Touring Car Championship, European Touring Car Championship and the British Touring Car Championship. The 156 touring car program was run by Fiat Group's partner N.Technology S.p.A., founded as Nordauto Squadra Corse, to compete in the Italian Touring Car Championship. In 1994, the name was changed to Nordauto Engineering, and to N.Technology in 2001.

In 1998, the 156 Group N version was offered for sale to the public. The 156 Group N had no carpets, seats or upholstery, but included additional track safety devices.

The following titles have been won by 156 drivers:
1998 Italian Super Touring Car Championship - Alfa Romeo 156 D2, Fabrizio Giovanardi
1999 Italian Super Touring Car Championship - Alfa Romeo 156 D2, Fabrizio Giovanardi
2000 European Super Touring Car Cup Winner - Alfa Romeo 156 D2, Fabrizio Giovanardi
2000 South American Super Touring Car Championship, Oscar Larrauri
2001 FIA European Touring Car Championship - Alfa Romeo 156 D2, Fabrizio Giovanardi
2002 FIA European Touring Car Championship - Alfa Romeo 156 GTA Super 2000, Fabrizio Giovanardi
2003 FIA European Touring Car Championship - Alfa Romeo 156 GTA Super 2000, Gabriele Tarquini

Specifications for touring car versions:

Coloni S1 Alfa Romeo 156

Italian race car constructor Coloni made a one-off racing car prototype for FIA Group-E Formula Libre called the Coloni S1 Alfa Romeo 156, or 156 Maxiturismo.

References

External links

 Alfa Romeo 156 resources (International) 
 

2000s cars
156
All-wheel-drive vehicles
Cars introduced in 1997
Compact executive cars
Alfa Romeo 156 Crosswagon Q4
Front-wheel-drive vehicles
Sports sedans
Station wagons
Touring cars